Håkan Ulf Göran Algotsson (born August 5, 1966, in Tyringe, Sweden) is a retired Swedish ice hockey goaltender.

Algotsson began his career with his hometown Tyringe SoSS in 1983.  In 1988, Algotsson joined Västra Frölunda and would spend the next eleven seasons with the team.  In 1999, he moved to Germany's Deutsche Eishockey Liga with Star Bulls Rosenheim for one season before returning to Frölunda for one final season before retiring in 2001. Algotssons final season was Henrik Lundqvist first season with Frölunda.

Algotsson was the starting goalie for team Sweden during the 1994 Winter Olympics in Lillehammer, but left the team prior to the quarterfinal against Germany, this was because his wife went into labor. Sweden went on to win their first olympic gold in hockey with Tommy Salo replacing Algotsson.

References

External links
 
 

1966 births
Living people
Frölunda HC players
Ice hockey players at the 1994 Winter Olympics
Medalists at the 1994 Winter Olympics
Olympic gold medalists for Sweden
Olympic ice hockey players of Sweden
Olympic medalists in ice hockey
People from Hässleholm Municipality
Starbulls Rosenheim players
Swedish ice hockey goaltenders
Swedish expatriate ice hockey players in Germany
Sportspeople from Skåne County